Jazz in ¾ Time is an album by American jazz drummer Max Roach featuring tracks recorded in late 1956 and early 1957 and released on the EmArcy label.

Reception

Allmusic awarded the album 4 stars and its review by Scott Yanow states, "These excellent performances show that jazz does not always have to be in 4/4 time in order to swing".

Track listing
All compositions by Max Roach except as indicated
 "Blues Waltz" - 6:31
 "Valse Hot" (Sonny Rollins) - 14:21
 "I'll Take Romance" (Oscar Hammerstein II, Ben Oakland) - 4:31
 "Little Folks" - 5:36
 "Lover" [mono take] (Lorenz Hart, Richard Rodgers) - 5:35
 "Lover" [stereo take] (Hart, Rodgers) - 5:35
 "The Most Beautiful Girl in the World" (Hart, Rodgers) - 7:05
Recorded in New York City on September 19, 1956 (track 7) and at Capitol Tower Studios in Hollywood, California on  March 18 (tracks 1 & 3), March 20 (tracks 2 & 4) & March 21 (tracks 5 & 6), 1957

Personnel 
Max Roach - drums
Kenny Dorham - trumpet
Sonny Rollins - tenor saxophone
Ray Bryant (track 7), Bill Wallace (tracks 1-6) - piano
George Morrow - bass

References 

1957 albums
Max Roach albums
Albums produced by Bob Shad
EmArcy Records albums